Potter-Williams House may refer to:

Potter–Williams House (Davenport, Iowa)
Potter–Williams House (Huntington, New York)

See also
Potter House (disambiguation)
Williams House (disambiguation)